Mary Oliver (born in La Jolla, California) is an American performer on violin, viola, and Hardanger fiddle, in the areas of New Music, free improvisation, and avant-garde jazz.

She currently lives in Amsterdam, where she is professor at the Hogeschool voor Kunst and musical director of the Magpie Music Dance Company. She also performs and releases albums with the Instant Composers Pool.

Education
Oliver studied for her Master of Fine Arts in violin and viola at San Francisco State University and at Mills College. In 1993 she obtained a doctorate from the University of California, San Diego in Theory and Practice of Improvisation (Constellations in Play: A Model of Improvisation), which substantially informed her methods as a performer.

Career
As a soloist she performs as much composed as improvised music, giving first performances of works by, for example, Richard Barrett, John Cage, Chaya Czernowin, Morton Feldman, Brian Ferneyhough, Liza Lim, George E. Lewis and Richard Teitelbaum. Oliver is a member of the Nieuw Ensemble, SONOR and KIVA, as well as the ICP-Orchestra.

She has performed with, among others, Ab Baars, Sean Bergin, Tobias Delius, Scott Fields, Ig Henneman, Tristan Honsinger, Achim Kaufmann, Joëlle Léandre, Thomas Lehn, George E. Lewis, Misha Mengelberg, Phil Minton, Michael Moore and Evan Parker. She has received invitations to perform at festivals all over the world, such as the North American New Music Festival, Xenakis Festival in Buffalo, New York, Darmstadt Summer Course, Donaueschingen Festival and Ars Electronica (Linz).

Critical acclaim
Mary Oliver is referred to as an internationally acclaimed Amsterdam violinist.  To quote the Austin Music Co-op website, "Her premieres of new works by John Cage, Richard Barrett, Brian Ferneyhough, and Iannis Xenakis speak to the level of virtuosity she has achieved. Her equally brilliant work as an improviser is a rarity in the ranks of first-rate classical interpreters."

Partial discography
 Witchfiddle ICP 038
 ICP-Orchestra, Oh, My Dog! ICP 040
 ICP-Orchestra, Aan en Uit  ICP 042
 Ig Henneman Strijkkwartet, Pes Wig 05

References

External links
bbc.co.uk, "Hear And Now", Mary Oliver at London Jazz Festival
o-art.org, Barbara Golden presents two separate performances of "Music for strings and voice"
frankvanbomme1.nl, Mary Oliver with the Frank van Bommel Ensemble
rateyourmusic.com, "Mary Oliver, Thomas Lehn & Han Bennink"

American jazz violists
American jazz violinists
Free improvisation
Living people
Women violinists
San Francisco State University alumni
Mills College alumni
University of California, San Diego alumni
20th-century classical violinists
21st-century American violinists
People from La Jolla, San Diego
Musicians from San Diego
American classical violinists
American classical violists
Women violists
20th-century classical musicians
21st-century classical musicians
20th-century American women musicians
Jazz musicians from California
21st-century American women musicians
Classical musicians from California
21st-century classical violinists
Year of birth missing (living people)
ICP Orchestra members
20th-century American violinists
20th-century violists
21st-century violists